1550 in music involved some significant events.

Events 
Feb.26 – Robin Mallapert succeeded François Roussel as maestro di cappella at the Cappella Giulia at St Peter's Basilica in Rome.
Oct.1 – Jacob Clemens employed as a singer and composer by the Marian Brotherhood in 's-Hertogenbosch, Netherlands. He leaves after just three months but does leave a parting gift of the seven-voice motet .
Giovanni Animuccia comes to Rome and is employed by Cardinal Guido Ascanio Sforza.

Publications 
Antonino Barges – First book of villottas for four voices (Venice: Antonio Gardano), also includes a few works by Andrea Patricio
Jacques Buus – First book of French chansons for five voices (Venice: Girolamo Scotto)
Perissone Cambio – Second book of madrigals for five voices (Venice: Antonio Gardano)
Baldassare Donato
 for four voices (Venice: Girolamo Scotto)
Heinrich Faber – , published in Nuremberg.
Claude Gervaise, ed.
Fourth book of dances for four instruments (Paris: Pierre Attaignant)
Fifth book of dances for four instruments (Paris: Pierre Attaignant)
Hoste da Reggio – Magnificat for four voices (Milan: Innocentio Ciconiarus), also includes other hymns and motets
John Marbeck – Booke of Common Praier noted, published in London.
Francesco Portinaro – First book of madrigals for five voices (Venice: Antonio Gardano)
Ramamatya – theoretical treatise on Carnatic music Svaramelakalanidhi.
Cipriano de Rore – madrigal collection Il primo libro de madregali published in Ferrara.
Adrian Willaert – Salmi spezzati, a collection of antiphonal sacred music, published in Venice.

Sacred music

Secular music

Births 
 July 3 – Jacobus Gallus, late Renaissance Czech composer of Slovene origin (died 1591)
 December 6 (baptised) – Orazio Vecchi, Italian composer (died 1605)
 probable – John Mundy, English composer and organist (died 1630), son of composer William Mundy
 probable – Sebastian Raval, Spanish composer (died 1604)
 probable – Vicente Espinel, Spanish writer, guitarist, poet and priest (died 1624)
 probable – Ippolito Baccusi, Italian composer (died 1609)
 probable – Emilio de' Cavalieri, Italian composer, organist, choreographer, teacher and diplomat (died 1602)
 probable – Francis Cutting, English lutenist and composer (died 1596)
 probable – Konrad Hagius, German court composer, musician and Kapellmeister (died 1616)
 probable – Simon Lohet, Flemish composer and organist (died 1611)
 probable – Juan Navarro (of Cadiz), Spanish composer (died c.1610)
 probable – Alessandro Orologio, Italian composer and trumpeter (died 1633)
 probable – Laura Peverara, Italian singer, harpist and dancer (died 1601)
 probable – Jakub Polak, Polish lutenist and composer (died c.1605)
 probable – Jan Tollius, Dutch composer and choirmaster (died c.1603)

Deaths 
 Matthias Greitter poet, cantor, composer and singer died in Strasbourg (c.55)
 – approx. year Silvestro Ganassi dal Fontego, musician and writer, died in Venice (c.58)
 – approx. year Johannes Galliculus, theorist and writer, died in Leipzig (c.60)
 – approx. year Pierre Moulu, Franco-Flemish composer (c.66)
 – approx. year Jean Richafort, Netherlandish composer (c.70)

 
Music
16th century in music
Music by year